The 1983 African Women's Handball Championship was the fifth edition of the African Women's Handball Championship, held from 23 to 30 July 1983 at the Cairo International Stadium and the Police Arena in Cairo, Egypt.

Draw

Preliminary round

Group A

* Note:  Advance to semi-finals

Group B

* Note:  Advance to semi-finals

Knockout stage

Bracket

Third place game

Final

Final ranking

External links
Results on todor66.com

1983 Women
African Women's Handball Championship
African Women's Handball Championship
1983 in African handball
Women's handball in Egypt
1983 in women's handball
July 1983 sports events in Africa
1983 in African women's sport